Relations between Cuba and Venezuela were established in 1902. The relationship deteriorated in the 1960s and Venezuela broke relations in late 1961 following the Betancourt Doctrine policy of not having ties with governments that had come to power by non-electoral means.  A destabilizing factor was the Cuban support for the antigovernment guerrilla force that operates in remote rural areas. Venezuela broke off relations with Cuba after the Machurucuto invasion in 1967, when Cuban trained guerrillas landed in Venezuela seeking to recruit guerrillas and overthrow the government of Raúl Leoni. Relations were reestablished in 1974.

In 1999 the bilateral relation significantly improved during the Presidency of Hugo Chávez. Chávez formed a major alliance with Cuban president Fidel Castro and significant trade relationship with Cuba since his election in 1999. The warm relationship between the two countries continued to intensify. After decades of close ties in the Caribbean, several governments in the region started to distance from the United States. Hugo Chávez described Castro as his mentor and called Cuba "a revolutionary democracy".

The bilateral relation includes development aid, joint business ventures, large financial transactions, exchange of energy resources and information technology, and cooperation in the fields of intelligence service and military. A characteristic of Cuba-Venezuela ties is that both nations exchange assets with each other which are inexpensive for the sending country but of high significance for the receiving country.

Early history

Venezuela and Cuba's ties go back to when Cuba was still under Spanish rule, when among the signers of the Act of Independence of Venezuela in 1811 was Francisco Javier Yánez native of Puerto Principe (actual Camagüey).

In June, 1817, Gregor MacGregor, a Scottish adventurer styling himself the "Brigadier General of the United Provinces of New Granada and Venezuela, and General-in-Chief of the Armies of the Two Floridas", came to Amelia Island under spanish rule of Captaincy General of Cuba. MacGregor, purportedly commissioned by general  Simón Bolívar, had raised funds and troops for a full-scale invasion of Florida, but squandered much of the money on luxuries. As word of his conduct in the South American independence wars reached the United States, many of the recruits in his invasion force deserted. Nonetheless, he overran the island with a small force and proclaimed the "Republic of the Floridas",  but left for Nassau in September.

In the celebrated battle of Carabobo (1821)  José Rafael de las Heras from Havana fought fiercely at side of the patriot army. Promoted to colonel by general Simón Bolívar himself, and before whom the Liberator would make the promise not to sheathe his sword until Cuba was free.

In 1823 the "Conspiracy of Rayos y Soles de Bolivar"  was led by the Venezuelan Carlos Aponte, who along with a group of Venezuelans and Cubans arrived in Cuba on an expedition that was discovered in Havana and executed its members by Spanish colonial forces.

When the Spanish army withdrew in defeat to Cuba after the decisive Battle of Lake Maracaibo (1823), many Venezuelan royalists were exiled, as colonel Narciso Lopez, Marcos Maceo, who would be father of revolutionary Antonio Maceo, Calixto Garcia de Luna, who would be grandfather of Cuban Independence major general Calixto Garcia. They continued to serve the Spanish government in several military and administrative posts in Cuba and Spain.  After turned against Spanish rule, they became a partisan of the independist faction in Cuba. In 1848, during an arrest of Cuban revolutionaries, López fled to the United States where attempted to liberate the island and make an independent Cuba that would eventually join the United States as a slave state. The modern Flag of Cuba originates from his first expedition landed in Cárdenas, was designed by Lopez, as well as a local Cuban named Miguel Teurbe Tolon. In 1851 Lopez and many Americans of the second failed expedition were executed in Castle Salvador de La Punta of Havana.

During the Ten Years War (1868- 1878), from Venezuela came, among others, José Miguel Barreto Pérez, Manuel María Garrido Páez, Cristobal Mendoza,  Salomé Hernández Hernández, Cristóbal Acosta, José María Aurrecoechea Irigoyen and Amadeo Manuit. They all fought for the Independence of Cuba  in several battles standing out for their bravery. Salomé Hernández died in Cuba because of illness, while  Acosta, Aurrecoechea Irigoyen and  Manuit, drowned the insular soil with their blood, helping to lay the foundations of the growing friendship and solidarity between Cuba and Venezuela. In Guaimaro, Carlos Manuel de Céspedes, president of the Republic in Arms on April 12, 1869, designates the Venezuelan Cristóbal Mendoza, Minister encharged of Foreign Relations, a young man among the Camagüeyans was the first to take up arms. Son of Cristóbal Mendoza, first President of Venezuela and friend of Bolivar who in 1813, after the defeat of the First Republic wrote to him in the following words: "Come without delay: come. The country needs it. I will go ahead conquering and you will continue organizing me; Because you are the man of the organization, as I am of the conquest." Cristóbal Mendoza reached the rank of colonel and died in front of the Spanish firing squad on December 30, 1870, two days after falling prisoner in Najasa, Camagüey.

In 1871 the president Antonio Guzman Blanco, supported the so-called "Venezuelan Expedition of the Vanguard", which landed in the eastern department of Cuba on June 17 commanded by the Cuban Brigadier Rafael de Quesada. In this attempt to liberate Cuba were 200 men, mostly Venezuelans, with 600 weapons, ammunition and 40 mules. In Camagüey, they fought the successful combat of Sabanas del Ciego, in which the Spanish forces were very decimated. But it was not an obstacle that the Cuban patriot Jose Marti, implying in Venezuelan politics, was expelled by Guzman Blanco in 1881. Marti must hurriedly leave Caracas, where he planned to live his exile, without being able to say farewell to his friends and return to New York.

Descendants of Bolivar and relatives of marechal Antonio Jose de Sucre, they fought in the War of the 95.

20th century

In 1902 under president Cipriano Castro, Venezuela and Cuba established diplomatic relations not long after the latter became independent aftermath the  Spanish–American War. By 1913, Cuba and Venezuela signed an extradition treaty. 

During the years of the Fidel Castro guerilla which fight in the Sierra Maestra to overthrown the dictator Fulgencio Batista were many gestures and actions of Venezuelan solidarity with the 26th of July Movement. In fact, after the fall of dictator Marcos Perez Jimenez on January 23, 1958 a street campaign called "The March of Bolivar to the Sierra Maestra",  $220,000 were collected, as well as a lot of arms and ammunition that were taken by Captain Hector Abdelnour Musa on board of a C-46 airplane, purchased for that purpose, which were delivered to Cuban  guerilla. The weapons imported from United States, came from the arsenals of the Venezuelan Army. All this was managed by René Estévez with the knowledge and approval of then-President Wolfgang Larrazabal, supported by his brother Carlos and other officers like Hugo Trejo. In turn, Venezuelan broadcasters had the initiative to retransmit the war parts of the Radio Rebelde through Radio Rumbos and Radio Continent, which allowed to know the advances of the Castro guerillas and the setbacks of the dictator Batista.

With the triumph of the Cuban Revolution, on January 1, 1959, a new period was opened in Havana-Caracas bilateral relations. On January 3, 1959, the Minister of State of Cuba requested from the Venezuelan Ministry of Foreign Affairs the recognition of the new Cuban Government, which emerged after the fall of Batista. On January 5, 1959, the Venezuelan Government recognizes the newly established Cuban government in Havana.

On January 23, 1959 Castro visited Venezuela. It was his first trip abroad after the triumphal entry in Havana on January 6, 1959. During five-day in Caracas Castro was  celebrated as a continental hero by Venezuelan people. The trip had one main reason: to express appreciation to the Venezuelan people for their valuable moral and material contribution to the cause of Cuba Libre.

Castro was honorated with a  welcoming ceremony offered by the Congress, and also at the Venezuela Central University, the Municipal Council of Caracas and the multitudinary meeting in the Plaza El Silencio. At the Venezuela Central University, he met a great poet, the Chilean Pablo Neruda, who spoke in a massive act of students and read his Canto a Bolivar. Luis Báez summarized what Neruda said: "In this painful and victorious hour that the peoples of America live, my poem with changes of place, can be understood directed to Fidel Castro, because in the struggles for freedom the fate of a Man to give confidence to the spirit of greatness in the history of our peoples.". Castro also met with President-elect Rómulo Betancourt, unsuccessfully requesting a loan and a new deal for Venezuelan oil.

1960s–1999

Relations rapidly deteriorated after president Rómulo Betancourt came to power in February, 1959 as Castro sought to bring Venezuela's oil wealth into his own revolution. In the 1960s, Castro supplied combat training and arms to Venezuelan guerillas.

In November 1961, President Betancourt broke relations with Cuba following a policy, called the Betancourt Doctrine, of not having ties with governments that had come to power by non-electoral means. In January 1962, Venezuela voted to expel Cuba from the Organization of American States (OAS) and in July 1964 successfully petitioned to have OAS sanctions imposed on Cuba after the discovery of arms cache on a Venezuelan beach the previous November, dropped by Cubans for use by the Fuerzas Armadas de Liberación Nacional (FALN) guerrillas seeking to establish a Marxist government. Castro had inspired the guerrillas who threatened Betancourt's government and elections scheduled for 1963.

In 1966, Arnaldo Ochoa with the Venezuelan guerrilla commander Luben Petkoff, took a boat from Cuba to the shores of Falcón, Venezuela, on a secretive expedition. Along with 15 other Cuban troops was sent by Castro to strengthen guerrillas fighting alongside Venezuelan militant Douglas Bravo, they attempted to attack the government of Raúl Leoni which ended in a major strategic loss and a large cost of human life. Only one year later, a dozen of Cuban and Venezuelan guerrillas trained by Cuba landed in May 1967 near the Machurucuto beaches and were intercepted by the Venezuelan Army. Soon after, the Venezuelan government held a press conference denouncing Cuban aggression against Venezuela and showing the two captured Cubans, Manuel Gil Castellanos and Pedro Cabrera Torres. Cuba was denounced by Venezuela to the OAS. Cuba did not recognize the action even when the investigation of the AK47s in possession of the guerrillas were identified as weapons sold by Czechoslovakia to Cuba. The Government of Venezuela broke all relations with Cuba after this incident and then take them back in 1974.

Once Betancourt and his similarly minded successor Raúl Leoni left office, Venezuela increasingly identified with the Third World and guerrilla activity waned, with Castro renouncing his exportation of his revolution, allowing for a tentative rapprochement. Diplomatic relations were restored in 1974 by government of Carlos Andrés Pérez, oil deliveries resumed, and Venezuela advocated Cuba's readmission to the OAS. Tensions occasionally resurfaced, especially over Venezuela's handling of those who attacked Cubana Flight 455 in 1977. Four terrorists associated with Coordination of United Revolutionary Organizations, a CIA linked organization, bombed Cubana Flight 455. A trial was held in Venezuela and Freddy Lugo and Hernán Ricardo Lozano both received 20 years in prison. Tensions rose after Orlando Bosch was acquitted and Luis Posada Carriles escaped prison for the US. Tensions resurfaced when Cubans sought refuge in Venezuela's Havana embassy in 1980.

In 1992, Castro initially denounced the 1992 Venezuelan coup d'état attempts performed by Hugo Chávez. However, after Chávez was pardoned in 1994, Castro invited him to Havana seeking more international assistance following the collapse of the Soviet Union which damaged Cuba's economy.

1999–present

Chávez and Castro

British journalist and historian Richard Gott pointed that Hugo Chávez and Fidel Castro share several similarities. Castro became a national hero in Cuba after his failed Moncada Barracks attacks on July 26, 1953, and Chávez led the unsuccessful February 1992 Venezuelan coup d'état attempt. Castro spent several years in prison and then led a two-year-long guerrilla war before assuming power in 1959 and Chávez also came to power after spending a period in prison and established his own political movement.

In 1999, Chávez visited Havana and stated at the University of Havana (UH), "Venezuela is traveling towards the same sea as the Cuban people, a sea of happiness and of real social justice and peace". He called Castro "brother" and said:

Following the 2002 Venezuelan coup d'état attempt, Chávez grew closer to Cuba in order to gain their assistance so he could hold on to power. Chávez could no longer trust his own personnel in his "situation room" and brought in the G2, Cuban intelligence. One Chávez aide stated that "I saw their strategy: seal Chávez off from public, manipulate him, nourish his insecurity, find evidence of assassination plots, of betrayals. Make him paranoid." Venezuela would trade tens of thousands of barrels of oil for military personnel and intelligence from Cuba while Chávez also received assistance with social programs in order to maintain voter loyalty.

In 2005, Chávez said that the cooperation between Cuba and Venezuela is an example of what socialism can and should do. While jointly appearing with Castro on a six-hour TV phone-in programme in August 2005, Chávez said he did not see Cuba as a dictatorship; he said "It's a revolutionary democracy". Chávez said the democracy promoted by George W. Bush is "a false democracy of the elite" and a "democracy of bombs". Chávez regards Castro as his mentor.

In May 2008, Venezuelan Foreign Minister Nicolás Maduro, leading a delegation in Cuba to attend the 12th meeting of the Cuba-Venezuela Political Consultation Body, met Vice President of Cuba Carlos Lage Dávila at the Ministers' Council headquarters to discuss the situation in Latin America and other bilateral issues. At the opening of the meeting, Maduro said Cuban Revolution "showed us the path of the second, real political, economic, social and cultural independence 50 years ago". Describing the relations between the two countries, he said "our relation is a profound, longstanding, strategic fraternity by which we have become a single people, a single nation, as dreamed by the liberating fathers". Maduro held talks with Raúl Castro also and discussed issues related to bilateral relations.

Post-Chávez relations

Hugo Chávez died in March 2013. A  special presidential election was held in April, which was won by Chávez's Vice President, Nicolás Maduro.

Following Chávez's death, Castro sought a new benefactor after Venezuela's economy was in ruin and the oil trade between the two countries were beginning to slow. With Cuba needing new support, relations between the United States and Cuba began to be reestablished in 2014 during United States–Cuban Thaw.

Maduro was re-elected for a second term in May 2018, but the result was denounced as fraudulent by most neighboring countries, the European Union, Canada and the United States. Cuba, however, recognized the elections and congratulated Maduro.

In January 2019, the majority opposition National Assembly declared that Maduro's reelection was invalid and declared its president, Juan Guaidó, to be acting president of Venezuela. The United States, Canada, and most of Western Europe and Latin America (including Brazil, Colombia, Argentina) recognized Guaidó as interim president. Cuba, however, continued to support Maduro.

In April 2019, the opposition-majority National Assembly voted and approved to cut Venezuela's oil supply to Cuba, aiming to save at least US$2,585,000 daily, according to its President Juan Guaidó.

Venezuelan president Nicolás Maduro is said to trust the Cubans more than his fellow Venezuelans, meaning Maduro's protection is in the hands of the Cuban security and intelligence services.

Economic ties
On December 14, 2004, Chávez and Castro signed a joint declaration which said that neoliberalism acts as "a mechanism to increase dependence and foreign domination". The two leaders described the US-supported Free Trade Area of the Americas (FTAA) as an "expression of a hunger to dominate the region" and said that the free trade area will result in increase in poverty and subordination in Latin America. According to the joint declaration, economic integration is necessary for the Latin American nations to earn a respected position in the world economy, but this integration will be based on mutual cooperation.

On January 25, 2007, Chávez and Cuba's Vice President Carlos Lage signed an agreement to develop a range of production projects which involved nickel, electricity and rice. This deal also included construction of an underwater fiber optics cable to bypass a US embargo which was aimed to be built within 2009. From 2008 to 2011, Hugo Chávez's government in Venezuela gave Cuba $18 billion in loans, investments and grants.

During the crisis in Bolivarian Venezuela, trade between the two countries slowed. Venezuela's exports to Cuba dropped from $5.1 billion in 2014 to $1.6 billion in 2016, while Cuban exports to Venezuela declined from $2 billion to $642,000 in the same period.

Merchandise trade with Venezuela fell to $2.2 billion in 2016, compared with $4.2 billion the year before and $7.3 billion in 2014, the Cuban National Statistics Office reported on its website.

Oil

But for Cuba,  is of high value. Much of this oil obtained from Venezuela is subsidized.

In 2007, the two countries established a joint venture to revamp the Cienfuegos oil refinery in Cuba. Venezuela and Cuba were set to invest approximately $800m to $1bn in primary stage into the programme. According to this scheme, 51% share of the plant will be held by Cuba and 49% by Petróleos de Venezuela S.A. (PDVSA), the Venezuelan state-owned petroleum company. In December 2007, Chávez attended the Petrocaribe summit in Havana along with several prime ministers and presidents from around the Caribbean and Central America.

In 2019, the opposition controlled National Assembly voted and approved to cut Venezuela's oil supply to Cuba, saving at least $2,585,000 daily, according to its Speaker Juan Guaidó.

Health care

In return for Venezuelan oil, Cuba is sending approximately 30,000 to 50,000 technical personnel to Venezuela, including physicians, sport coaches, teachers, and arts instructors who offer social services, often in poverty-stricken regions. Under the programme Convenio de Atención a Pacientes implemented in 2000, Venezuela send patients and their relatives for medical treatment in Cuba where the Government of Venezuela pays the transportation costs, and Cuba bears all other expenses.

In April 2005, the presidents Chávez and Castro signed an agreement to increase the number of healthcare workers in Venezuela in exchange for oil shipments. As part of the agreement, Cuba would help Venezuela train 30,000 "comprehensive community doctors" to staff Venezuela's "Barrio Adentro" (Inside the Barrio) public health program which included establishment of 1,000 free medical centers and surgical treatment for approximately 100,000 Venezuelans in Cuba. With Cuban assistance, Barrio Adentro network has four stages, delivering free healthcare from 7,000 local community clinics up to hospital level. The program is measured to have administered over 500 million consultations and saved over 1.4 million lives since its founding. In 2005 alone,  50,000 Venezuelans went to Cuba for free eye treatment.

In conjunction with other government social programs, Barrio Adentro has been an important factor in the improvement of health indicators over the previous decade. This was highlighted in a study by the Council for Social and Economic Research which found that among other indicators, between 2003 – 2006 alone infant mortality fell in Venezuela from 18.5 per 1000 births to 14.2 per 1000 births.

Research

The Venezuelan Institute for Scientific Research and Cuban scientists collaborated in a research project for analyzing "stress" in rice production caused by drought or saline soils. Research findings on this were presented in the 4th International Encounter on Rice held in Havana in 2008. One of the several objectives of this joint scientific project is to understand the effectiveness of the hormones.

Military ties
Close ties with Cuba are helping Caracas in its goal to transform the military of Venezuela; these began in 2004. As part of an effort to remove US influence from the country, the Army of Venezuela is trying to replace NATO-compliant Belgian rifles with the AK-103. The Military of Cuba has over 40 years experience handling Soviet and Russian military equipment, and in training combatants in guerrilla warfare and in counterinsurgency operations.

Views from abroad
American journalist and political scientist Michael Radu in his book Dilemmas of Democracy & Dictatorship expressed negative view over this bilateral relations stating "most of Chávez' policies are distinctly anti-democratic, often unconstitutional, and usually anti-American and pro-Castro". Another American, Frank Gaffney, founder of the Center for Security Policy organization, expressed similar negative view in the book War Footing where he writes, "Chávez represents what Castro always wanted to be: the leader of a revolution that extends  well beyond his own territory. Castro has helped Chávez learn how to undermine and destabilize liberal democracies throughout the region by using Castro's own tested methods of political warfare. ... Castro has decades of experience; Chávez has money and power. Theirs is a partnership with Chávez in charge".

The Federal government of the United States maintains the view that both Chávez and Castro were trying to undermine democracy in the Caribbean and portrays Chávez as a security threat. Critics say Chávez is using petroleum sales under preferential terms to increase his political influence in the Caribbean. He has been criticized for making friendly relations with Cuba, which is a long-time opponent of the United States. In January 2005, the United States Secretary of State Condoleezza Rice called Cuba "outpost of tyranny" and Chávez a "negative force" in Latin America. Chávez was criticized by opponents on the basis that he was trying to establish a Cuban-style authoritarian government.

But the United States' view on this issue has been criticized. Irum Abbasi, researcher of The Institute of Strategic Studies in Islamabad writes, "To the US, the real issue has never been human rights but the success of its client regimes in the region, which is substantiated by the fact that it tends to overlook those human rights abuses that are perpetrated by pro-US regimes". She stated that the United States has criticized Cuba and Venezuela for human rights abuses, but often tolerated and even supported regimes which violated human rights, but were anti-communist. Historian Jane Franklin in an article titled Who's Afraid Of Venezuela-Cuba Alliance? gave the example that in 1952 the United States supported a coup which installed Fulgencio Batista as dictator of Cuba and writes "U.S. overthrows of elected governments are nothing new, as demonstrated in Brazil, Chile, the Dominican Republic, and Haiti, to name a few". Franklin pointed that Cuba is well developed in health care and was once the only nation in Latin America to offer universal free health care, and with the help of Cuba, Venezuela has been able to give free health care to many of its citizens; thus the both countries respect health care as a basic human right. Regarding Rice's remark, she stated that the Bush administration and the media have increased their attack against Chávez and Castro.

Richard Gott in his book Hugo Chávez and the Bolivarian Revolution described the United States as "the chief imperial power in the region and the champion of the neo-liberal philosophy" and said that Chávez and Castro have directed their rhetoric against this US policy. British-Pakistani historian, filmmaker and political campaigner Tariq Ali in a letter to The Guardian wrote, "The government of the US has no moral authority to elect itself as the judge over human rights in Cuba, where there has not been a single case of disappearance, torture or extra-judicial execution since 1959, and where despite the economic blockade, there are levels of health, education and culture that are internationally recognised". Abbasi noted that recent election results in several Latin American countries indicate a drift towards left-wing politics which she analyzes a result of public anger over neoliberalism.

References

External links
Cuba and Venezuela turn against ethanol
Venezuelan delegate Germán Mundaraín Hernández praises Cuba's human rights record during the review of Cuba by the United Nations Human Rights Council's Universal Periodic Review, February 5, 2009

 
Bilateral relations of Venezuela
Venezuela